New York's 112th State Assembly district is one of the 150 districts in the New York State Assembly. It has been represented by Christopher Friend since 2011.

Geography 
District 112 contains all of Tioga County and portions of Broome and Chemung counties.

Recent election results

2022

2020

2018

2016

2014

2012

References 

124
Tioga County, New York
Broome County, New York
Chemung County, New York